Makwarela is a township situated in Limpopo Province in Vhembe district.  Makwarela is one of the townships which were built in the apartheid period. Makwarela has a large variety of people mainly coming from rural backgrounds who reside there to improve their quality of life.

References

Populated places in the Thulamela Local Municipality
Townships in Limpopo